Peanut clump virus (PCV) is a plant pathogenic virus.  It is assigned to the genus Pecluvirus.

References

External links
 ICTVdB - The Universal Virus Database: Peanut clump virus
 

Viral plant pathogens and diseases
Virgaviridae